Valeri Grigorievich Poluyanov (7 February 1943 – 9 February 2015) was a Soviet association football forward. In the semifinals of the 1969 Soviet Cup, his team, MFC Mykolaiv, lost to eventual champion FC Karpaty Lviv.

References

External links
 Профиль на сайте footbook.ru
 

1943 births
2015 deaths
FC Vostok players
MFC Mykolaiv players
FC Enerhiya Nova Kakhovka players
Russian footballers
Association football forwards